Hista is a genus of moths within the family Castniidae.

Species
Hista fabricii (Swainson, 1823)
Hista hegemon (Kollar, 1839)

References

Castniidae